TVP3 Poznań (also known as Telewizja Poznań) is one of the regional branches of the TVP, Poland's public television broadcaster. It serves the entire Greater Poland Voivodeship.

From 1994 till 2002 it was branded PTV. It has been using its current name from 2002 with almost 10-year hiatus from October 6, 2007 till January 1, 2016 when it was branded TVP Poznań.

From October 6, 2007 till August 31, 2013 it served as a part of TVP Info.

Programmes 
Some of TVP Poznań's programmes include:
 Kronika (Chronicle) – local news from Greater Poland
 Telekurier (Telecourier) – nationwide programme covering social issues

External links 
Official website

Telewizja Polska
Television channels and stations established in 1957
Mass media in Poznań